Emerson University, Multan, formerly known as the Government Emerson College Multan is located in the city of Multan in the Punjab province of Pakistan. It is also called Govt. College Multan, GC Multan, or Govt. Bosan Road College Multan. It is the largest college in Multan city located on Bosan Road. The prestigious and historic school is affiliated with Bahauddin Zakariya University, Multan, Pakistan.

History
It was established on 13 April 1920. In 1933, this institution was named Government Emerson College, after Sir Herbert William Emerson, governor of the Punjab in recognition of his services to education.

The first campus of this college was on Kachehry Chowk in Multan, now the location of Government Women university Multan; which is upgraded from a girls Degree College. The new campus, built to meet the needs of the growing number of male student, was completed in 1963. After that time, the college began offering post graduate programs. The larger campus includes a stadium for cricket, hockey and football ground, basketball ground, hostels and college building.

Courses
It serves as a higher secondary school and graduation college offering Bachelor (BS 04 Years), Intermediate programs, such as FA, F.Sc, I.Com, ICS, and postgraduate programs. Postgraduate classes include M.Sc. Zoology (1989); M.A Political Science (1993); M.A English (1996); M.Sc. Botany; M.A. Economics; M.A. Urdu in (2004); and M.A. Islamiat (2005). Also offering M.Sc Physics; M.Sc Chemistry; and M.A International Relations.

Students who meet generous threshold for attained grades are eligible to receive a free laptop. All students in BS, MS, LLM, M.Phil and Ph.D programs are automatically eligible to receive a free laptop.

Official website of Govt Emerson College Multan relaunched in October 2017.

Notable graduates
 Inzamam Ul Haq- Former Captain of Pakistan Cricket Team
 Ehsan Wyne - Pakistani lawyer, political activist and secretary general of the Awami National Party
 Tassaduq Hussain Jillani - Ex Chief Justice of Pakistan
 Faiz Mohammad Khan - Medical physicist specializing in radiation oncology
 Mazhar Kaleem - Pakistani novelist
 Mirza Aziz Akbar Baig - Lawyer of the Supreme Court of Pakistan
 Tauqeer Nasir - TV actor - Dir. General of PNCA
 Muhammad Ali (actor) - Lollywood Actor
 Abdul Jabbar- Scientist at NDC (NESCOM)
 Mohsin Naqvi - Urdu Poet
 Irshad Hussain is a Pakistani chemist and Nanomaterials scientist.
 Khalid Masood Khan - Famous Poet, Columnist, Writer, Former Chairman Multan Electric Power Company (MEPCO),  General Secretary Multan Tea House, Member BoG Academy of Letters Pakistan.
  Saif Ullah Gadi- Famous engineer and scientist

References

 
Universities and colleges in Multan
Public universities and colleges in Punjab, Pakistan